A blessing is a religious pronouncement.

Bless may also refer to:
 Bless (game), a massively multiplayer online role-playing game developed by Neowiz Games
 "Bless" (song), a 2010 single by L'Arc-en-Ciel
 Bubbles, a Swedish band also known as "Bless"
 Bless (album), a 2003 album by Bubbles
 Bless Online, Korean MMORPG
BLESS, a method in molecular biology for screening of DNA double-stranded breaks in the genome

See also
 Blesse (disambiguation)
 Blessed (disambiguation)
 Blessing (disambiguation)